van Houwelingen is a Dutch toponymic surname. "Houwelingen" may refer to :nl:Houweningen a town in the Grote Hollandse Waard, which flooded at the 1421 St. Elizabeth's flood. Notable people with the surname include:

 Adri van Houwelingen (born 1953), Dutch cyclist
 Arie van Houwelingen (born 1931), Dutch cyclist
 Hans van Houwelingen (born 1945), Dutch medical statistician
 Jan van Houwelingen (1939-2013), Dutch politician
 Jan van Houwelingen (born 1955), Dutch cyclist
 Pepijn van Houwelingen (born 1980), Dutch politician

References

Dutch-language surnames
Surnames of Dutch origin